Jennifer Brady was the defending champion but chose not to participate.

Katie Swan won the title, defeating Jodie Burrage in the final, 6–0, 3–6, 6–3.

Seeds

Draw

Finals

Top half

Bottom half

References

External Links
Main Draw

Lexington Challenger - Singles
2020 Women's Singles